Ueng Ming-yih (born 1 July 1952) is a Taiwanese skier. He competed at the 1976 Winter Olympics and the 1984 Winter Olympics.

Ueng is from Tongxiao, Miaoli County.

To train for the 1980 Winter Olympics, he took skiing lessons in Austria. In 1978, he focused on a daily run of 10 km. As a substitute for skiis, he used a pulley board to practice skiing while travelling. While training in Austria, Ueng learned Standard German.

References

External links
 

1952 births
Living people
Taiwanese male biathletes
Taiwanese male cross-country skiers
Olympic biathletes of Taiwan
Olympic cross-country skiers of Taiwan
Biathletes at the 1976 Winter Olympics
Biathletes at the 1984 Winter Olympics
Cross-country skiers at the 1976 Winter Olympics
Cross-country skiers at the 1984 Winter Olympics
Place of birth missing (living people)